Wei Wenbo (Chinese: 魏文伯; Pinyin: Wèi Wénbó; 1905–1987) was a Chinese politician who was born in Huanggang, Hubei. His birth name was Wei Qufei (Chinese: 魏去非)

Early life 
In 1905 Wei was born in Huanggang, Hubei, China.

Career 
In 1925, Wei joined the Communist Youth League of China.

In 1926, Wei joined the Chinese Communist Party.

In 1952, Wei founded and became the President of the East China University of Political Science and Law.

In 1979, Wei became the Minister of Justice until 1982.

In 1983, Wei was chosen to become a member of The Central Advisory Commission of China.

Personal life 
He was married to a fellow Chinese revolutionary, Li Jingyi.

He died due to old age and sickness in 1987.

He had 4 daughters and 1 son. 

He was also a poet.

References

External links
 Wei Wenbo's profile

1905 births
1987 deaths
People's Republic of China politicians from Hubei
Politicians from Huanggang
Chinese Communist Party politicians from Hubei
Presidents of East China University of Political Science and Law
Ministers of Justice of the People's Republic of China